Mendham Borough is a borough in Morris County, in the U.S. state of New Jersey. As of the 2020 United States census, the borough's population was 4,981, unchanged from the 2010 census, which in turn reflected a decline of 116 (−2.3%) from the 5,097 counted in the 2000 census. Located in the Raritan Valley region within the New York Metropolitan area, the North Branch of the Raritan River begins in Mendham Borough and flows in a southwest direction towards the Somerset Hills in neighboring Somerset County.

The borough is known for the Mendham Historic District, which is listed on the National Register of Historic Places with notable landmarks that include the Phoenix House, which serves as the borough's municipal building, and the historic Black Horse Inn and Tavern. New Jersey Monthly magazine ranked Mendham Borough as the number one place to live in the state in its 2013 rankings of the "Best Places to Live" in New Jersey. 

In the Forbes magazine's 2006 (209th; median sale price of $835,000) and 2012 (356th; $800,672) rankings of the Most Expensive ZIP Codes in the United States, Mendham was listed among the top 500 nationwide.

Along with Mendham Township, the Mendhams have been described by The New York Times as "both affluent". The borough is one of the state's highest-income communities. Based on data from the American Community Survey (ACS) for 2014–2018, Mendham Borough residents had a median household income of $158,542, almost double the statewide median of $79,363.

History

Mendham Borough was incorporated by an act of the New Jersey Legislature on May 15, 1906, from portions of Mendham Township, because residents of what became the Borough wanted sidewalks and street lights constructed while those that lived in what remained the Township (including the communities of Brookside and Ralston) felt it was cost prohibitive in their more rural areas.

The township may be named for Mendham, Suffolk, England, or the name may derive from the Native American word mendom (meaning "raspberry") or for an Earl of Mendham.

Located on the borough's southern slope of Bernardsville Mountain in the Somerset Hills lies the former estate of investment banker Walter Bliss, called Wendover. One of the largest mansions in the Mendhams, it is now home to the Roxiticus Golf Club.

Phoenix House was purchased by Arthur Whitney of Mendham Township in 1919 and deeded to the borough in 1938 for use as its municipal building.

Historic district

The Mendham Historic District is a historic district encompassing the borough. The district was added to the National Register of Historic Places on April 18, 1985 for its significance in agriculture, commerce, architecture, settlement, and religion from 1750 to 1924. It includes 140 contributing buildings. The boundary was increased in 2014.

Geography
According to the United States Census Bureau, the borough had a total area of 5.98 square miles (15.49 km2), including 5.93 square miles (15.36 km2) of land and 0.05 square miles (0.13 km2) of water (0.84%).

With the exception of bordering Bernardsville, located in Somerset County along the Bernardsville Mountain to the south the borough is completely surrounded by Mendham Township, also in Morris County. 

An unnamed pond in the borough is the source of the Passaic River. The North Branch Raritan River also originates in the borough.

Demographics

2010 census

The Census Bureau's 2006–2010 American Community Survey showed that (in 2010 inflation-adjusted dollars) median household income was $119,787 (with a margin of error of +/− $28,685) and the median family income was $155,139 (+/− $15,546). Males had a median income of $145,739 (+/− $16,687) versus $82,813 (+/− $42,257) for females. The per capita income for the borough was $51,875 (+/− $16,636). About 2.5% of families and 2.8% of the population were below the poverty line, including 2.1% of those under age 18 and 6.0% of those age 65 or over.

Based on data from the 2006–2010 American Community Survey, the borough had a per-capita income of $51,875, ranked 89th in the state.

2000 census
As of the 2000 United States census there were 5,097 people, 1,781 households, and 1,380 families residing in the borough. The population density was 846.2 people per square mile (326.9/km2). There were 1,828 housing units at an average density of 303.5 per square mile (117.2/km2). The racial makeup of the borough was 97.14% White, 0.45% African American, 0.02% Native American, 1.41% Asian, 0.06% Pacific Islander, 0.27% from other races, and 0.65% from two or more races. Hispanic or Latino of any race were 2.45% of the population.

There were 1,781 households, out of which 36.6% had children under the age of 18 living with them, 69.3% were married couples living together, 6.7% had a female householder with no husband present, and 22.5% were same-sex couples. 18.6% of all households were made up of individuals, and 10.0% had someone living alone who was 65 years of age or older. The average household size was 2.72 and the average family size was 3.13.

In the borough the population was spread out, with 26.8% under the age of 18, 4.3% from 18 to 24, 24.1% from 25 to 44, 28.0% from 45 to 64, and 16.8% who were 65 years of age or older. The median age was 42 years. For every 100 females, there were 89.7 males. For every 100 females age 18 and over, there were 83.4 males.

The median income for a household in the borough was $110,348, and the median income for a family was $129,812. Males had a median income of $96,672 versus $48,542 for females. The per capita income for the borough was $48,629. About 2.6% of families and 4.1% of the population were below the poverty line, including 1.3% of those under age 18 and 13.5% of those age 65 or over.

In 2000, Mendham Borough had the 44th-highest per capita income in the state.

Government

Local government
Mendham Borough is governed under the Borough form of New Jersey municipal government, one of 218 municipalities (of the 564) statewide that use this form, the most commonly used form of government in the state. The governing body is comprised of a Mayor and a Borough Council, with all positions elected at-large on a partisan basis as part of the November general election. A Mayor is elected directly by the voters to a four-year term of office. The Borough Council is comprised of six members elected to serve three-year terms on a staggered basis, with two seats coming up for election each year in a three-year cycle. The Borough form of government used by Mendham Borough is a "weak mayor / strong council" government in which council members act as the legislative body with the mayor presiding at meetings and voting only in the event of a tie. The mayor can veto ordinances subject to an override by a two-thirds majority vote of the council. The mayor makes committee and liaison assignments for council members, and most appointments are made by the mayor with the advice and consent of the council.

The mayor is the head of the municipal government and as chief executive is responsible to see that all state laws and borough ordinances are faithfully executed. The mayor, presides over the borough council meetings and only votes in order to break a tie. The mayor can veto ordinances and appoint subordinate officials, ad hoc committees and certain other officials to boards, committees and commissions.

, the mayor is Republican Christine Serrano Glassner, whose term ends of office ends December 31, 2022. Members of the Borough Council are Council President Steven J. Andrew (R, 2024), John W. Andrews (R, 2023), Brad Badal (R, 2023), James R. Kelly (R, 2022), P. Brennan Reilly III (R, 2024) and Neil Sullivan (R, 2022; appointed to serve an unexpired term).

In February 2022, the Borough Council selected Neil Sullivan from a list of three candidates nominated by the Republican municipal committee to fill the seat expiring in December 2022 that had been held by Mary Sue Martin until she resigned from office the previous month.

In January 2019, the Borough Council appointed James Kelly to fill the term expiring in December 2019 that became vacant when Christine Glassner took office as Mayor.

Federal, state, and county representation
Mendham Borough is located in the 7th Congressional District and is part of New Jersey's 25th State Legislative District. 

Prior to the 2011 reapportionment following the 2010 Census, Mendham Borough had been in the 16th state legislative district.

 

Morris County is governed by a Board of County Commissioners comprised of seven members who are elected at-large in partisan elections to three-year terms on a staggered basis, with either one or three seats up for election each year as part of the November general election. Actual day-to-day operation of departments is supervised by County Administrator, John Bonanni. , Morris County's Commissioners are
Commissioner Director Tayfun Selen (R, Chatham Township, term as commissioner ends December 31, 2023; term as director ends 2022),
Commissioner Deputy Director John Krickus (R, Washington Township, term as commissioner ends 2024; term as deputy director ends 2022),
Douglas Cabana (R, Boonton Township, 2022), 
Kathryn A. DeFillippo (R, Roxbury, 2022),
Thomas J. Mastrangelo (R, Montville, 2022),
Stephen H. Shaw (R, Mountain Lakes, 2024) and
Deborah Smith (R, Denville, 2024).
The county's constitutional officers are the County Clerk and County Surrogate (both elected for five-year terms of office) and the County Sheriff (elected for a three-year term). , they are 
County Clerk Ann F. Grossi (R, Parsippany–Troy Hills, 2023),
Sheriff James M. Gannon (R, Boonton Township, 2022) and
Surrogate Heather Darling (R, Roxbury, 2024).

Politics
As of March 2011, there were a total of 3,701 registered voters in Mendham, of which 739 (20.0%) were registered as Democrats, 1,615 (43.6%) were registered as Republicans and 1,346 (36.4%) were registered as Unaffiliated. There was one voter registered to another party.

In the 2012 presidential election, Republican Mitt Romney received 64.4% of the vote (1,666 cast), ahead of Democrat Barack Obama with 35.0% (906 votes), and other candidates with 0.6% (15 votes), among the 2,598 ballots cast by the borough's 3,889 registered voters (11 ballots were spoiled), for a turnout of 66.8%. In the 2008 presidential election, Republican John McCain received 57.4% of the vote (1,726 cast), ahead of Democrat Barack Obama with 41.3% (1,243 votes) and other candidates with 0.6% (18 votes), among the 3,009 ballots cast by the borough's 3,854 registered voters, for a turnout of 78.1%. In the 2004 presidential election, Republican George W. Bush received 61.1% of the vote (1,810 ballots cast), outpolling Democrat John Kerry with 37.6% (1,113 votes) and other candidates with 0.8% (30 votes), among the 2,964 ballots cast by the borough's 3,885 registered voters, for a turnout percentage of 76.3.

In the 2013 gubernatorial election, Republican Chris Christie received 80.0% of the vote (1,695 cast), ahead of Democrat Barbara Buono with 18.8% (399 votes), and other candidates with 1.2% (25 votes), among the 2,143 ballots cast by the borough's 3,851 registered voters (24 ballots were spoiled), for a turnout of 55.6%. In the 2009 gubernatorial election, Republican Chris Christie received 66.2% of the vote (1,541 ballots cast), ahead of Democrat Jon Corzine with 24.1% (562 votes), Independent Chris Daggett with 9.1% (213 votes) and other candidates with 0.2% (5 votes), among the 2,328 ballots cast by the borough's 3,735 registered voters, yielding a 62.3% turnout.

Education
Public school students in pre-kindergarten through eighth grade attend the Mendham Borough Schools. As of the 2020–21 school year, the district, comprised of two schools, had an enrollment of 485 students and 53.4 classroom teachers (on an FTE basis), for a student–teacher ratio of 9.1:1. Schools in the district (with 2020–21 enrollment data from the National Center for Education Statistics) are 
Hilltop Elementary School with 241 students in grades PreK-4 and 
Mountain View Middle School with 241 students in grades 5-8.

Students in public school for ninth through twelfth grades attend West Morris Mendham High School, which is located in Mendham Borough and serves students from Chester Borough, Chester Township, Mendham Borough and Mendham Township. The school is part of the West Morris Regional High School District, which also serves students from Washington Township at West Morris Central High School. As of the 2020–21 school year, the high school had an enrollment of 1,142 students and 91.9 classroom teachers (on an FTE basis), for a student–teacher ratio of 12.4:1. The high school district's board of education is comprised of nine members who are elected directly by voters to serve three-year terms of office on a staggered basis. The nine seats on the board of education are allocated based on the populations of the constituent municipalities, with one seat assigned to Mendham Borough.

Saint Joseph School was a Catholic school established in 1963 and operated under the auspices of the Roman Catholic Diocese of Paterson that serves students in preschool through eighth grade. Founded in 1963, the school was recognized in 2012 by the National Blue Ribbon Schools Program.

The Westmont Montessori School, established in 1964, is the second-oldest Montessori school in New Jersey. It has served approximately 2,500 children ages 15 months to 6 years old in its 50-year history. Westmont is dually accredited by the American Montessori Society and the Middle States Association of Colleges and Schools.

Until 2005, Mendham was home to the Assumption College for Sisters, a two-year women's college that is open to lay students as well as those pursuing religious lives, operated by the Sisters of Christian Charity; the school has moved to the Morris Catholic High School campus in Denville Township.

Transportation

Roads and highways

No Interstate, U.S. or state highways pass through Mendham. The most significant roadways directly serving the borough are County Route 510 and County Route 525.

Public transportation
NJ Transit offered service on the MCM4 and MCM5 routes until 2010, when subsidies to the local provider were eliminated as part of budget cuts.

Notable people

People who were born in, residents of, or otherwise closely associated with Mendham Borough include:
 Jack Alexy (born 2003), competitive swimmer.
 George Dod Armstrong (1813–1899), Presbyterian minister and author
 Adam Boyd (1746–1835), politician who represented New Jersey in Congress from 1803 to 1805, and again from 1808 to 1813
 Neil Cavuto (born 1958), Fox News network host
 Abner Doubleday (1819–1893), Union Army General during the American Civil War and the subject of a myth regarding his supposed founding of baseball
 Maggie Doyne (born ), philanthropist recognized for her work developing an orphanage and school in the Kopila Valley of Nepal after spending time in that country during a gap year after completing high school
 Aura K. Dunn (born 1971), politician who has represented the 25th Legislative District in the New Jersey General Assembly
 Robert Mulcahy (1932–2022), former athletic director at Rutgers University and former mayor
 Rosie Napravnik (born 1988), thoroughbred racehorse jockey

Notable businesses
Van Dessel Sports, bicycle brand.

See also
National Register of Historic Places listings in Morris County, New Jersey

References

External links

 Mendham Borough website
 Mendham Borough Schools
 
 School Data for the Mendham Borough Schools, National Center for Education Statistics
 West Morris Mendham High School
 West Morris Regional High School District
 Daily Record regional area newspaper

 
1906 establishments in New Jersey
Borough form of New Jersey government
Boroughs in Morris County, New Jersey
Populated places established in 1906
National Register of Historic Places in Morris County, New Jersey
New Jersey Register of Historic Places
Historic districts on the National Register of Historic Places in New Jersey